Marsha Coleman-Adebayo is an American former senior policy analyst for the United States Environmental Protection Agency (EPA). Beginning in 1996, she filed complaints alleging that a company from the United States was mining vanadium in South Africa and harming the environment and human health. The EPA did not respond, and Coleman-Adebayo reported her concerns to other organizations. When the EPA subsequently did not promote Coleman-Adebayo at her request, she filed suit against the agency, alleging racial and gender discrimination. On August 18, 2000, a federal jury found EPA guilty of violating the civil rights of Coleman-Adebayo on the basis of race, sex, color and a hostile work environment, under the Civil Rights Act of 1964.  Her experience inspired passage of the Notification and Federal Employee Anti-discrimination and Retaliation Act of 2002 (No FEAR Act).

During the legal proceedings, Coleman-Adebayo remained employed at the EPA. When she was diagnosed with hypertension, the agency agreed to let her remote work. After five years and another lawsuit, the EPA ordered Coleman-Adebayo to return to the office, placing her on unpaid leave when she did not comply.

Coleman-Adebayo is a founder and leader of the No FEAR Coalition and EPA Employees Against Racial Discrimination. Through her leadership the No FEAR Coalition, working closely with Representative James Sensenbrenner, organized a successful grass-roots campaign and secured passage of the "Notification of Federal Employees Anti-discrimination and Retaliation Act," the first Civil Rights Law of the 21st Century. The Act was signed into law by President George W. Bush in 2002.

Coleman-Adebayo currently serves on the board of directors of the National Whistleblower Center, a nonpartisan, nonprofit, advocacy group dedicated to protecting the rights of employee whistleblowers. Good Housekeeping presented her with its Women in Government award in 2003. Her first book, "No Fear: A Whistleblower's Triumph Over Corruption and Retaliation at the EPA" was published in September 2011 by Lawrence Hill Books.

As of April 2015, she also serves on the Green Shadow Cabinet of the United States as "Director of Governmental Transparency and Accountability".

In June 2015, Coleman-Adebayo endorsed Green Party presidential candidate Dr. Jill Stein while speaking at the National Press Club in Washington, D.C.

References

External links

No FEAR Coalition web site
Dr. Coleman-Adebayo's induction into the Project on Government Oversight Hall of Fame
Dr. Coleman-Adebayo bio from Barnard College
Announcement of Dr. Coleman-Adebayo defense fund 
|National Whistleblower Center

Living people
American whistleblowers
Year of birth missing (living people)